Gymnoceros nipholeuca is a moth in the family Depressariidae. It was described by Turner in 1946. It is found in Australia, where it has been recorded from New South Wales and Queensland.

The wingspan is about 32 mm. The fore- and hindwings are white.

References

Moths described in 1946
Depressariinae